"Worn Me Down" is a song by American singer Rachael Yamagata. It was released as a single from her debut CD, Rachael Yamagata (EP) and was the first single of off her first full-length album, Happenstance, which was released on June 8, 2004 in the U.S, and it is considered to be her most famous song to date.

Background
"Worn Me Down" first appeared on Rachael Yamagata's five song debut EP where it was listed as a featured song, and was released on October 7, 2003. In 2004, the song was released as a single from the EP in Germany. It was one of two songs on the EP that were re-recorded for her full-length album Happenstance and by comparison, the re-arranged version of the song had a more produced sound, featured edgier electric guitars and drums, and a dominant orchestration. The melody has been called "straight-forward", and Yamagata's voice as being mature, highly emotional, and raspy. Her vocal style on "Worn Me Down" has been compared to that of Tori Amos, P.J. Harvey and KT Tunstall. Prior to the album's release, several critics believed that "Worn Me Down" would be the first single Yamagata would put out off of the full-length album, but with differing reasons.

The lyrics convey feelings of helplessness and obsessiveness; they are from the viewpoint of a woman in a twisted romance, and she has virtually given up on the man she is with, who is in fact infatuated with another woman.

Reception
In general, critics gave positive to review to the song, claiming that "Worn Me Down" is an excellent platform for showcasing Yamagata's talent and maturity, and it has been called an "everlasting" song. However, some were dissatisfied with "Worn Me Down". PopMatters writer Marc Hogan called it "the disc's crassest moment", accusing Yamagata of placating to the Adult Contemporary audience with a generic song composition.

Additionally, critics were split between the version that appeared on the EP and the one that appeared on Happenstance. Katie Zerwas of PopMatters felt that the album version was overproduced and favored the version on the EP, whereas Gentry Boeckel of Stylus found that the EP version of "Worn Me Down" was "in an inferior form", stating that the one on the album was "100% better than the original.

Success
In 2005, "Worn Me Down"  premiered on the Billboard Charts under Adult Pop Songs, reaching No. 33, and stayed in the Top 40 for five weeks. Additionally, it was a Top 5 Hit at AAA radio, and was a favorite single in Billboard Music columnists' Michael Paoletta's "2004 in Review". The video for "Worn Me Down" also made the VH1 Top 40 list in December 2004 at No. 37, and peaked at No. 36 a few weeks later.  It remained on the VH1 charts just under two months, before falling off after the week of February 12, 2005.

"Worn Me Down" has been called a hit song, and has appeared on several television shows. It remains a favorite among fans. It is a very personal song to Yamagata, so much so that it has caused her to weep while performing it, and has even prompted some concert goers to shout out "On t’aime!" during a particularly intimate performance. It has also been recorded by several a cappella groups.

Chart performance

Song appearances

Promotional CD

Personnel
Vocals, Tambourine - Rachael Yamagata
Lead Guitar - Kevin Salem
Rhythm Guitar, Electric Piano (Rhodes), Synthesizer (Ms 2000), Shaker - John Alagía
Bass - Stewart Myers
Cello - Oliver Kraus
Drums - Brian Jones
Saxophone (Baritone) - Jason Singer
Assistant Engineer - Alex Dixon, Oswald Bowe, Ted Young
Engineer, Technician (Basic Tracking) - Jeff Juliano
Mixed By - Jeff Juliano, John Alagía
Music By, Lyrics By - Rachael Yamagata
Producer - John Alagia
Recorded By (Bass & Drums) - Stewart Myers
Credits from Discogs.

Other Versions 

 Album Version 3:43
 Alternative Version 4:34
 Marcus Dravs Remix 4:58
 KCRW Sessions 3:45

References

2004 songs